Route 52 is a major north-south arterial route in Winnipeg, Manitoba, Canada. It comprises all of Main Street, Queen Elizabeth Way, and St. Mary's Road.

Route description
Beginning at the northern city limits, the route runs south as Main Street along the west bank of the Red River. After passing through downtown, it becomes the Queen Elizabeth Way from the Main Street Bridge to the Norwood Bridge, over the Assiniboine and Red Rivers.  South of the Norwood Bridge, it continues along the east side of the river as St. Mary's Road to the south Perimeter Highway.  At the northern city limits, Route 52 becomes Manitoba Highway 9; at the south Perimeter Highway, it continues as Manitoba Provincial Road 200.

Route 52 passes through the suburbs of  West Kildonan, the North End, Downtown, Fort Rouge, St. Boniface, and St. Vital.  The section between Broadway and St. Anne's Road is part of Manitoba Highway 1, the Trans-Canada Highway.

Many of Winnipeg's most prominent buildings and institutions are located along Main Street, including City Hall, the Centennial Concert Hall, the Manitoba Museum, Union Station, the Richardson Building, and 360 Main (formerly the Commodities Exchange tower).

History
Main Street is one of the oldest routes in the Winnipeg region.  It originated as the trail between Lower Fort Garry and the various settlements huddled around the confluence of the Red and Assiniboine Rivers.  Its intersection with the Portage Trail near Upper Fort Garry (now downtown Winnipeg) spawned the Portage and Main corner, which is today the heart of the city.  Upper Fort Garry was eventually demolished by the city in order to straighten the southern portion of Main Street and realign it to its current configuration.  The north gate, the sole surviving piece of Upper Fort Garry, stands near the corner of Broadway and Main.

St. Mary's Road is named after St. Mary's Parish (Ste. Marie Paroisse in French), a Roman Catholic parish located in the northernmost section of St. Vital.  It was originally a trail that led from the parish south to the United States border at Emerson along the east side of the Red River.  In rural Manitoba, St. Mary's Road is now incorporated into Provincial Roads 200  and 246. 

A short section of Main Street was renamed Queen Elizabeth Way to commemorate the 2002 Royal Visit of Queen Elizabeth II to the city.

Photo gallery

Major intersections
From north to south:

References

052
Winnipeg Route 052